Palophaginae is a small beetle subfamily  within the family Megalopodidae. It contains two tribes, with five species in four genera:

 Tribe Palophagini Kuschel & May, 1990
 Genus Cucujopsis Crowson, 1946
 Cucujopsis setifer Crowson, 1946
 Genus Palophagoides Kuschel in Kuschel & May, 1996
 Palophagoides vargasorum Kuschel in Kuschel & May, 1996
 Genus Palophagus Kuschel in Kuschel & May, 1990
 Palophagus australiensis Kuschel in Kuschel & May, 1990
 Palophagus bunyae Kuschel in Kuschel & May, 1990
 Tribe †Lobanoviellini Kirejtshuk & Reid, 2021 Baltic amber, Eocene
 Genus †Lobanoviella Kirejtshuk & Reid, 2021
 †Lobanoviella andreyi Kirejtshuk & Reid, 2021

References

Megalopodidae
Beetle subfamilies